Porsuk is a village in the district of Pasinler, Erzurum Province, Turkey.

References

Villages in Pasinler District